Sarsicopia is a genus of Copepods in the family Platycopiidae. There is at least one described species in Sarsicopia, S. polaris.

References

Further reading

 

Copepods
Articles created by Qbugbot